Keith Robinson (born 17 December 1933) is an English former first-class cricketer.

While serving in the Royal Navy, Robinson played a single first-class cricket match for the Combined Services cricket team against Northamptonshire in 1961 at Northampton. Batting once in the match, he scored 18 runs in the Combined Services before being dismissed by Malcolm Scott.

References

External links

1933 births
Living people
People from Thirsk
Royal Navy sailors
English cricketers
Combined Services cricketers